Acanthocardia aculeata, the spiny cockle, is a species of  saltwater clams, marine bivalve molluscs in the family Cardiidae. The genus Acanthocardia is present from the Upper Oligocene to the Recent.

Description
The shell of Acanthocardia aculeata can reach a size of 50–115 mm. This shell is robust, broadly oval, with a heart-shaped profile, equivalve and inflated, with crenulated margins. The surface shows 20-22 prominent radial ribs, with rows of sharp spines, especially at sides. The basic coloration is usually pale brown. The interior is white, with grooves extending throughout the inside.

<div align=center>
Right and left valve of the same specimen:

</div align=center>

Distribution and habitat
Acanthocardia aculeata can be found in the Mediterranean Sea and in North East Atlantic. This species is present in sublittoral muddy sands. These mollusks are phytoplankton feeders.

References

 Repetto G., Orlando F. & Arduino G. (2005): Conchiglie del Mediterraneo, Amici del Museo "Federico Eusebio", Alba, Italy
 Biolib
 Encyclopedia of life
 Marlin
 World Register of Marine Species

Cardiidae
Bivalves described in 1758
Taxa named by Carl Linnaeus